The Battle of Dominguez Rancho or The Battle of the Old Woman's Gun or The Battle of Dominguez Hills took place on October 8th and October 9th, 1846, was a military engagement of the Mexican–American War that took place within Manuel Dominguez's 75,000 acre Rancho San Pedro. Captain José Antonio Carrillo, leading fifty California troops, successfully held off an invasion of Pueblo de Los Angeles by some 300 United States Marines, capturing for the first time in the few instances of U.S. history the U.S. Colors upon the battlefield, while under the command of US Navy Captain William Mervine, who was attempting to recapture the town after the Siege of Los Angeles. By strategically running horses across the dusty Dominguez Hills, while transporting their single small cannon to various sites, Carrillo and his troops convinced the Americans they had encountered a large enemy force. Faced with heavy casualties and the superior fighting skills displayed by the Californios, the remaining Marines were forced to retreat to their ships docked in San Pedro Bay.

Background
After receiving word of the Siege of Los Angeles, Commodore Robert F. Stockton sent US Navy Captain William Mervine and the Savannah on October 4 to San Pedro to assist Capt. Archibald H. Gillespie.  Arriving on October 7, Mervine set out on October 8 with sailors, marines and bear flaggers to recapture the town. (Note: there is confusion about the exact dates of the events, with some sources believing them to be a day earlier.)

Battle
Having little knowledge of the enemy, Mervine's march was poorly planned. It began inauspiciously with the death by friendly fire of a cabin boy upon landing. His troops were armed with an assortment of muskets, cutlasses and pikes; they brought no horses, wagons or cannons. The first leg of the planned march toward the pueblo, on October 8, was a six-hour dusty slog with little or no water, during which they were harassed by the enemy on the hillsides around them.

Mervine and his troops reached the abandoned Dominguez Rancho, where they camped for the night, within view of an advance detachment of Flores' troops. There was sporadic firing from the enemy during the night, with no other effect than that of depriving Mervine's party of sleep.  Setting off at daylight on the 9th, the Americans advanced just to the north of Dominguez Rancho.

When the Americans had occupied Los Angeles in August, residents had hidden some weapons by burying them. General José Flores' force, equipped with lances, knives and old firearms that had been hidden, was nearly as poorly armed, but it did have a cannon.

This old brass four-pounder, used ceremonially in the Los Angeles Plaza, had been buried in the garden of Inocencia Reyes.  It was dug up and mounted on a horse-drawn limber. (In another account, the "old Woman" is identified as Clara Cota de Reyes. It is said that she had buried the small cannon in a cane patch near her home with the help of her daughters, one of whom was named Inocencia.)

Señora Reyes' four-pounder was placed on the narrow trail that the Americans needed to use. Ropes (probably lassos or riatas) were lashed to the limber to pull the gun into the brush for reloading. The Californio horsemen deployed at a safe distance from the trail on the enemy's flanks.

The simple tactics proved effective. When the Americans came within 400 yards, the cannon was fired and quickly pulled back into the brush, followed by musket fire from the horsemen.

Mervine's forces were helpless on foot against a mounted enemy they could neither see nor count. Realizing they could not reach Los Angeles, Mervine had little choice except to retreat.

The main battle lasted less than an hour; five hours later Mervine's forces were back on their ship in San Pedro Bay.

Aftermath
Four of the seriously wounded Americans died and were buried on a little island in San Pedro Bay called Isla de los Muertos, along with the cabin boy. (Island of the Dead.). Mervine's troops reboarded the Savannah, and after a few days, the warship sailed north toward Monterey.

"The captured American flag" was later taken to Mexico City by Antonio Coronel, who had been in charge of ordnance during the battle. The fate of the old woman's gun is unclear. Some say it was surrendered to the Americans after the Capitulation of Cahuenga; however, another account tells that the cannon was resurrected by the Californio dons in 1853 for the celebration of the Fourth of July. According to the account of one Major Horace Bell, a Los Angeles Ranger, Juan Sepulveda dug up the gun from near his own property and took it to Dead Man's Island where he and his friends set it up near the graves of the Americans and fired a salute "in the exuberance of his patriotism." It is possible that the famous gun was displayed at the New Orleans Exposition of 1884-85 in the Navy Exhibit.

See also
Dominguez Rancho Adobe
Rancho San Pedro
List of conflicts in the United States
Battles of the Mexican–American War

References

External links
 A History of California: The American Period. Robert Glass Cleland. Published 1922. The Macmillan company. 512 pages
California History, Bancroft - https://web.archive.org/web/20120102074700/http://www.1st-hand-history.org/Hhb/HHBindex.htm

Battles of the Conquest of California
1846 in Alta California
History of Los Angeles County, California
Carson, California
United States Marine Corps in the 18th and 19th centuries
19th century in Los Angeles
October 1846 events
1846 in the Mexican-American War